Charles Herbert Murray (21 September 189926 June 1950) was the Anglican Bishop of Riverina in Australia from 1944 until his death in the 1950 Australian National Airways Douglas DC-4 crash in Western Australia. Also killed was Norman Blow, Dean of Newcastle.

Murray was educated at Wesley College, Melbourne, Trinity College, University of Melbourne and Christ Church, Oxford. He was ordained in 1923 and was a curate at St Dunstan's Camberwell and then priest in charge of Christ Church, Brunswick. He was Rector of Christ Church, North Adelaide from 1933 to 1938 and then Vicar of Christ Church, South Yarra until his appointment to the episcopate. He was consecrated a bishop on 2 February 1944 at St Andrew's Cathedral, Sydney.

References

External links

1889 births
People educated at St Paul's School, London
People educated at Wesley College (Victoria)
People educated at Trinity College (University of Melbourne)
University of Melbourne alumni
Anglican bishops of Riverina
20th-century Anglican bishops in Australia
20th-century Anglican archbishops
1950 deaths
Victims of aviation accidents or incidents in 1950